Bile acid-CoA:amino acid N-acyltransferase is an enzyme that in humans is encoded by the BAAT gene.

The protein encoded by this gene is a liver enzyme that catalyzes the transfer of the bile acid moiety from the acyl-CoA thioester to either glycine or taurine, the second step in the formation of bile acid-amino acid conjugates which serve as detergents in the gastrointestinal tract.

References

External links

Further reading